Chromosera cyanophylla is a species of fungus in the genus Chromosera. It is the type species of Chromosera. In young specimens, the slimy cap and stem are bright yellow, and the gills are of a lilac hue. The color soon fades to whitish yellow. The species can be found in small groups, specifically on soaked wood from conifers.

References

External links

Fungi described in 1861
Fungi of North America
Hygrophoraceae
Taxa named by Elias Magnus Fries